The 1894 South Kilkenny by-election was a parliamentary by-election held for the United Kingdom House of Commons constituency of South Kilkenny on 7 September 1894. The vacancy arose because of the resignation of the sitting member, Patrick Chance of the Irish National Federation. Only one candidate was nominated, Samuel Morris representing the Irish National Federation, who was elected unopposed.

Result

References

Unopposed by-elections to the Parliament of the United Kingdom in Irish constituencies
1894 elections in the United Kingdom
September 1894 events
By-elections to the Parliament of the United Kingdom in County Kilkenny constituencies
1894 elections in Ireland